Danton is a French given name that is a form of Antoine, Titouan, D'Anton and Antonin used in France, Switzerland, Belgium, Canada, West Greenland, Haiti, French Guiana, Madagascar, Benin, Niger, Burkina Faso, Ivory Coast, Guinea, Senegal, Mauritania, Western Sahara, Morocco, Algeria, Tunisia, Chad, Central African Republic, Cameroon, Equatorial Guinea, Gabon, Republic of the Congo, Democratic Republic of the Congo, Burundi, and Rwanda. As a surname, it is unrelated to Antonius-related names, but rather people from Anthon, Isère. Notable people with this name include the following:

Given name
Danton Cole (born 1967), American hockey player
Danton Heinen (born 1995), Canadian hockey player
Danton Mello (born 1975), Brazilian actor
 Danton Remoto (born 1963), Filipino writer, essayist, reporter, editor, columnist, & professor
Danton Stone, American actor

Nickname
 Robert Bodanzky, also known as Danton (1879–1923), Austrian journalist, playwright and poet

Surname
Christine Danton (stagename "The Amazing Cristina"), Australian contortionist
Georges Danton (1759–1794), French Revolutionary
Henry Danton (born 1919), British dancer
 Mike Danton (born 1980), Canadian former professional ice hockey player
 Ray Danton (1931–1992), American actor, director and producer

Fictional character
Danton Black, minor DC Comics character

See also

D'Anton Lynn
Dainton (disambiguation)
Dalton (given name)
Dalton (surname)
Danson (surname)
Danzon (surname)
Darton (surname)
Dayton (name)
Denton (disambiguation)
Denton (surname)
Dinton (disambiguation)
Dunton (disambiguation)

Notes

French masculine given names